Take Flight may refer to:
 Take Flight (album), 2005 album of Sylvester Sim
 Take Flight (musical), a musical that premiered in 2007
 Take Flight, a later version of the Walt Disney World attraction Delta Dreamflight
 Take Flight, a song of the album Shatter Me (album) from the American violinist Lindsey Stirling

See also
 Flight (disambiguation)